"Paroles, paroles" ("Words, words") is a song by French singer Dalida featuring French actor Alain Delon. It was released on 17 January 1973 as the lead single from her upcoming album Julien (1973). Lyrics describe the conversation of a man offering a woman caramels, bonbons et chocolat followed with shower of compliments, to what she says they mean nothing to her because they are just paroles – empty words. The song achieved big success in France and internationally, especially in Japan and Mexico, becoming one of the most recognizable French songs of all time. The first video clip was released in 2019, over 46 years after the songs's release.

It is a cover of an Italian duet by singer Mina and Alberto Lupo. Dalida's release sparked numerous covers in various languages, mostly thanks to her international career. The song was an unavoidable part of her repertoire, carrying her on tours in Europe, Japan, Latin America, the Arab world and the Francophone countries of Africa. Today it is regarded as Dalida's signature song and one of the classics of French chanson. While the expression paroles, paroles entered everyday language, immediately upon its release it was picked up by French politicians, and is ever since "used to evoke those who make promises and never hold them".

Background and recording 
In early 1972, composer Gianni Ferrio and lyricists Leo Chiosso and  wrote the song "Parole, parole" in Italian. It was created as a new opening theme for popular prime time Italian TV show Teatro 10, to which they were soundtrack creators. The show's hosts, singer Mina and actor Alberto Lupo, were the first to record it, and it was released in April of the same year. The song was a hit in Italy.

Dalida's brother and producer Orlando was in Italy at the time and noticed the song. He met the rights holder and offered Dalida to record her version, and she liked the idea. For the male voice, Dalida decided herself that she would ask Alain Delon, her friend of 17 years. He was delighted with the offer and immediately accepted. In 2011, Delon revealed that in the 1960s they had a romance that no one knew about but them. Orlando asked the young writer  to write the words because she, like Dalida, was born in Egypt and would understand Dalida's Italian accent. She accepted with satisfaction and Delon especially liked her text, as did Dalida, who wanted minor changes, which did not happen due to Michaële insistence.

The music was recorded separately from the vocals. Orlando and Guy Motta, Dalida's longtime concert conductor, made a complete remake of the instrumental, leaning towards Bossa nova. The vocals were also recorded separately. In Studio Des Dames, Dalida first recorded her part. Then Delon turned off the lights, asked for a stool and, while looking at Dalida in the dark, gave his answer to the soundtrack. Alain Delon said in 2006 that by the end of the song, as he repeated the lyrics "que tu est belle" (how beautiful you are), Dalida was constantly laughing. He recalled telling her: "I'm not telling you 'how beautiful you are' because those are the lyrics, but because you are beautiful!"

Mastering was led by Jean-Pierre Dupuy. In 2021. documentary "Archives secrètes", Orlando revealed that in the studio, after everyone had recorded their part, he asked Dalida and Delon to sing the song together, out of pleasure. He recalls: "There was a complicity that was not present when they recorded each their voices separately. I remember I watched out very much during the montage thinking on their "live performance" they improvised together."

Release and reception 
"Paroles, paroles" was released in France on a 18 cm (7") single under catalog number IS 45 711 of Dalida's private label International Shows, and distributed by Sonopresse. The B-side of the single is "Pour ne pas vivre seul". In other states it was released over the next few months, in Japan in April. Principality of releases have the same cover, with uncredited photos that were shot in her house garden on Montmartre. The photos were shot during the occasion that spawned one of the most iconic images of France in 1970s; "Dalida and Delon in rue d'Orchampt". Editions have translations of titles by country languages and font adjustments. Dutch and Argentinian releases feature completely different cover photos. Japanese release features the closeup of the main cover image, while the B-side is changed to "Une vie". Its 1980 re-edition changes B-side to "J'attendrai". Also a Japanese EP was published, with 3 other songs alongside "Paroles, paroles" and a cover photo that is closeup of verso cover from French release.

The song was an international hit and a huge sales success. It topped of various charts or hit parades. About half a million copies sold in France, over 200,000 in Japan and hundreds of thousands more in other countries. Equally a great success at Dalida's concerts where it was received by the audience. In her 1974 series of concert at Olympia, Delon's voice was replaced by stars of the time; Mike Brant, Ringo, Claude Francois and Patrick Juvet, while video of them was projected behind Dalida.

She prevented by touring Lebanon in January, and he with the filming of Two Men in Town, they never performed the song together on TV. Dalida made 2 appearances alone on TV in 1973, once only in the room and the second time a sketch in the telephone booth as if talking to Delon, while his videos are being shown. With Roger Pierre, she made a sketch of a funny nature in 1973.

Other languages 
Dalida recorded the song in German twice, first in 1973 with Friedrich Schütter, and in 1984 with Harald Juhnke. Both songs were of minimal success.

Cover versions 
After the success of Mina exclusively in Italy, in 1972 several Spanish and Portuguese covers appeared which did not achieve success. The Italian version received three little-noticed covers, the first in 1991. After Dalida released her song in 1973, a few covers in other languages appeared in countries where Dalida was popular, for example in Turkey 1975; Ajda Pekkan who made a string of Dalida's covers, Japan; Akiko Nakamura, and the Netherlands. Dalida's song was covered in French several times and also performed live on TV by Celine Dion and Delon himself in 1997. In 2021, Jarvis Cocker released a cover version on his album Chansons d'Ennui Tip-Top.

Legacy 
Over time, the song gained enormous significance in the world as one of the few most famous French songs. The title itself has settled into the collective unconscious and has become a formula used in everyday language to denote those who speak empty words. Deeply rooted in France, "Paroles, paroles" is unvoidable to be quoted by politicians in response to the shallow promises of their opposition, or even to be sang like Marine Le Pen did in 2012. In the same time, the song is comedians' favorite material for mocking politicians. In 2004, the song was used for a national energy campaign in France.

The hit song "Dalida", by Algerian rapper Soolking, released in 2018, features sample of "Paroles, paroles".

The only official video clip of "Paroles, paroles" was released on February 25, 2019. That was followed with a 12" maxi-single picture disc, released on 13 September 2019.

Trivia 
The single was released on Dalida's 40th birthday.
Alberto Lupo hosted the 1967 Partitissima, which was won by Dalida, and he starred opposite her in the 1968 Italian film Io ti amo.
The 2019 release features, at the end of the song, Delon's voice taken from an TV emission aired on 24 November 2018, where he expresses his love and memory of Dalida.

Formats and track listings

Personnel 
Credits adapted from liner notes.

 Guy Motta and his orchestra – conducting
 Jean-Pierre Dupuy – music recorded by
 Orlando – producing and artistic realisation
 Gianni Ferrio – composer
  – lyricist

Charts

References

Notes

Sources

External links
 

Songs about language
Dalida songs
1973 singles
1973 songs
1970s ballads
French songs
Alain Delon